Omotola Jalade Ekeinde  (born Omotola Jalade, 7 February 1978) is a Nigerian actress, singer, philanthropist and former model. Since her Nollywood film debut in 1995, Ekeinde has appeared in over 300 films, selling millions of copies. Omotola is the second Nigerian and first Nigerian celebrity to receive over 1 million likes on her Facebook page. She currently has a total of 3 million followers on Facebook.

In 2013, she was included in Time magazine's list of the 100 most influential people in the world.

In 2013, Ekeinde made a brief appearance on VH1's scripted series, Hit the Floor. On 2 November 2013, she spoke at the 2013 edition of the WISE- Summit, held in Doha, Qatar.

In 2014, she was honoured by the Nigerian government, when she became a Member of the Order of the Federal Republic (MFR) for her contributions to Nigerian cinema.

Early life and education 
Omotola Jalade, who is of Ondo descent, was born in Lagos State. She grew up with her parents and two younger brothers, Tayo and Bolaji Jalade. Her mother, Oluwatoyin Jalade née Amori Oguntade, worked at J.T Chanrai Nigeria, and her father, Oluwashola Jalade, worked at the YMCA and the Lagos Country Club.  She attended Chrisland School, Opebi (1981–1987), Oxford Children School (1987), Santos Layout, and Command Secondary School, Kaduna (1988–1993). She had a brief stint at Obafemi Awolowo University and completed her studies at Yaba College of Technology (1996–2004), where she studied Estate Management. She originally wanted a career in business management. However, while awaiting her results from university, she began modelling to earn a living.

Career

Acting career
Ekeinde was introduced to acting while accompanying a friend to an audition. Her first acting role was in the 1995 film Venom of Justice, directed by Reginald Ebere. She was given the lead role in the film. Her first major role was in the film Mortal Inheritance (1995), where she played a sickle-cell patient who fought for her life against small odds of survival. Since then, she has starred in several films, including Games Women Play, Blood Sisters, All My Life, Last Wedding, My Story, The Woman in Me and others.

For her role in Mortal Inheritance, she won "Best Actress in an English Speaking Movie" and "Best Actress Overall" at the 1997 Movie Awards. She was the youngest actress in Nigeria at that time to win this.

In the late 1990s and early 2000s, she starred in several sequel films, including Lost Kingdom II, Kosorogun II, and Blood Sister II, leading to a grand achiever award from the Global Excellence Recognition Awards in 2004. She was awarded best Actress in a supporting role during the Africa Movie Academy Awards in 2005.

After shooting roughly three hundred video movies, Ekeinde received her first cinematic movie role in the 2010 film "Ije". This film was shot at locations in Jos and the United States."Ije" was the highest grossing Nollywood film at the time – A feat later broken by Phone Swap (2012). In 2012, she starred in the Nollywood thriller, Last Flight to Abuja which became the second-highest-grossing movie in West African cinemas in 2012. She has gone on to win over forty domestic and international awards.

In 2015, Ekeinde celebrated her 20th anniversary in the entertainment industry, having appeared in about two hundred films. In June 2018, Ekeinde and fellow Nigerian Femi Odugbemi received invitations to be voting members at the Academy Awards.

Music career
Ekeinde launched a music career in 2005 with the release of her debut album titled "gba". The album produced the singles "Naija Lowa" and "The Things You Do To Me." Her unreleased second album – Me, Myself, and Eyes, brought in production from Paul Play and Del B. It was supported by the songs "Feel Alright", featuring Harrysong, and "Through the Fire", featuring Uche.

In late 2012, Ekeinde began working on her third album and enlisted the help of The Bridge Entertainment. She went to Atlanta, Georgia in the United States to work with producers and songwriters who could help create a sound that would resonate with American audiences. She had studio sessions with Kendrick Dean, Drumma Boy and Verse Simmonds and recorded a song with singer Bobby V.

Reality show
In 2012, Ekeinde also launched a reality television show, Omotola: The Real Me, on Africa Magic Entertainment, a M-Net subsidiary broadcast on DStv. She was the first Nigerian celebrity to star in her own reality show.

Philanthropy
Ekeinde became a United Nations World Food Programme Ambassador in 2005, going to missions in Sierra- Leone and Liberia. She also supports organisations such as Charles Odii's SME100 Africa to empower youth and young women in society. She has been active in the Walk the World project and participated in the Walk the World campaign in Liberia with President Ellen Johnson Sirleaf.

Her human rights campaign work is centered on her NGO project, called the Omotola Youth Empowerment Program (OYEP). This undertaking brought hundreds of youths together for the Empowerment Walk and Convention. She lent her voice in 2010 to the "Rewrite The Future" campaign of Save The Children UK.

She became an Amnesty International campaigner in 2011 and has participated in campaigns in Sierra-Leone (Maternal Mortality) and a 2012 campaign for the Niger Delta in Nigeria, where she shot a video asking Shell plc and the government to "own up, clean up, pay up| and take responsibility for the oil spills in the Niger Delta.

In June 2020, she visited an orphanage home in Tanzania run by Tanzania Mitindo House which focuses on HIV infected children, with Tanzanian actress Wema Sepetu.

To promote the 2021 World No Tobacco Day and the #SmokeFreeNollywood campaign, Ekeinde and actors (Dakore Egbuson-Akande, Daniel Effiong, Meg Otanwa, Michelle Dede, Osas Ighodaro pledged to stop smoking in their movie scenes, as it had a negative influence on young kids who looked up to them. The campaign was backed by US non-profit organization Tobacco-Free Kids and a sub-Saharan public strategy firm - Gatefield.

Awards and recognition
Ekeinde has a regular column in OK! Nigeria Magazine titled "Omotola's Diary", which features writings about her life and experiences. On 5 November 2013, she received the Ebony Vanguard Award at the Music Video and Screen Awards (MVISA) held in Birmingham, England. On 9 November 2013, Oba Victor Kiladejo, the Royal king of Ondo Kingdom conferred on Omotola a chieftaincy title in her hometown of Ondo State.

In 2012, CNN Travel included Ekeinde's accent on their list of the "world's twelve sexiest accents|. The Nigerian accent ranked fifth on the list. In 2013, she was included in Time magazine's list of the 100 most influential people in the world.

Ekeinde was included in the list of Top 100 most influential Africans by New African magazine in 2013.

In 2015, she was listed among the highest-grossing movie actors. Others on the list included Shah Rukh Khan, Frank Welker, Bob Bergen, Jack Angel, Mickie McGowan, Michael Papajohn, Martin Klebba, Clint Howard and Chris Ellis. This listing was compiled and researched by Yahoo!.

Personal life
Jalade married Captain Matthew Ekeinde in 1996. Together, they have four children.

Selected filmography

Discography

Studio albums
 GBA (2005)
 Me, Myself, and Eyes (unreleased)

Singles

Awards and nominations

See also
List of Yoruba people
List of Nigerian actresses

References

External links

 
 
 

21st-century Nigerian women singers
1978 births
Living people
Yoruba actresses
Actresses from Lagos
Nigerian philanthropists
20th-century Nigerian actresses
21st-century Nigerian actresses
Yoruba women philanthropists
Nigerian Christians
Best Supporting Actress Africa Movie Academy Award winners
Yaba College of Technology alumni
Members of the Order of the Federal Republic
Actresses in Yoruba cinema
English-language singers from Nigeria
Obafemi Awolowo University alumni
Models from Lagos
Yoruba women musicians
Yoruba female models
Actresses from Ondo State
Nigerian film award winners
Nigerian humanitarians